Shawnee is an unincorporated community in Effingham County, in the U.S. state of Georgia.

History
A post office called Shawnee was established in 1910, and remained in operation until 1918. The community was named after the Shawnee Indians.

References

Unincorporated communities in Georgia (U.S. state)
Unincorporated communities in Effingham County, Georgia